The women's kumite 55 kilograms competition at the 2018 Asian Games took place on 26 August 2018 at Jakarta Convention Center Plenary Hall, Jakarta, Indonesia.

Schedule
All times are Western Indonesia Time (UTC+07:00)

Results

Main bracket

Repechage

References

External links
Official website

Karate at the 2018 Asian Games
2018 in women's karate